Paradise is the fifth studio album, and the sixth album overall, by the American country music band Pirates of the Mississippi. It was released in 1995 as their only album for the Giant label, and it did not produce any chart singles. Shortly after this album's release, Pirates of the Mississippi disbanded, and remained inactive until guitarist Rich Alves and vocalist Bill McCorvey reunited in the early 2000s as a duo.

David Malloy produced the entire album, with assistance from James Stroud on all tracks except "Paradise", "I Think Locally", and "Feed Jake".

Content
The title track was later recorded by John Anderson on his 1996 album which was also titled Paradise, and was also produced by James Stroud. Anderson's version of the song was a single.

Track listing
"Paradise" (Bob McDill, Roger Murrah) – 2:46
"Let the Joneses Win" (John Jarrard, Wendell Mobley, Kent Wells) – 3:02
"911" (Bill McCorvey, Rich Alves, Gary Harrison) – 2:48
"The Biggest Broken Hearts" (McCorvey, Alves, Harrison) – 3:51
"I Think Locally" (McCorvey, Murrah, John Schweers) – 3:08
"Weakness for the Weekend" (Tim Johnson) – 2:48
"When Her Love Was Mine" (Bob Regan, Mark D. Sanders) – 2:56
"Country" (Murrah, Marcus Hummon) – 2:34
"Rodeo Queen" (Alves, McCorvey, Dean Townson) – 3:42
"Feed Jake" (Danny Mayo) – 4:09
live recording

Critical reception
Giving it 3 out of 5 stars, Shawn Ryan of New Country magazine praised the album for its "upbeat romps" and "songs with a keen eye for detailing the heart of blue-collar life with respect and affection".

Personnel
Compiled from liner notes.

Pirates of the Mississippi
 Rich Alves — lead guitar, background vocals
 Jimmy Lowe — drums, background vocals
 Bill McCorvey — lead vocals, rhythm guitar
 Dean Townson — bass guitar, background vocals
Additional musicians
 Larry Byrom — acoustic guitar
 Glen Duncan — fiddle
 Paul Franklin — steel guitar, Dobro
 Rob Hajacos — fiddle
 Dann Huff — electric guitar
 Steve Nathan — piano, Hammond B-3 organ, keyboards
 Johnny Neel — piano
 John Wesley Ryles — background vocals
 Gary Smith — piano
 Joe Spivey — fiddle
 Glenn Worf — bass guitar
 Curtis Wright — background vocals
 Curtis Young — background vocals

References

External links
[ Paradise] at Allmusic

1995 albums
Giant Records (Warner) albums
Pirates of the Mississippi albums
Albums produced by David Malloy
Albums produced by James Stroud